Mindspace may refer to:

Business 
 Raheja Mindspace, a brand of commercial and industrial parks in India
 Mindspace, a flow chart software for Amiga
 Mindspace, a Danish publisher, which specializes in non-fiction books about psychology, philosophy and management.

Education 
 Mindspace, a programme to encourage entrepreneurship at the National Technical University of Athens
 Mindspace, the library of the Millennia Institute
 Mindspace, a student magazine at Vivekanand Education Society's Institute of Technology

Other uses
 Mindspace Model, a behavioural change design model established by the UK Cabinet Office